The National Rugby League (NRL) is an Australasian rugby league club competition which contains clubs from New South Wales, Queensland, Victoria, the Australian Capital Territory and New Zealand. The NRL formed in 1998 as a joint partnership between the Australian Rugby League (ARL) and media giant News Corporation-controlled Super League, in the aftermath of the 1990s Super League war, in which both ran parallel to each other in 1997. The partnership was dissolved in 2012, with control of the NRL going to the re-constituted ARL, which was re-structured with an independent board of directors and renamed the Australian Rugby League Commission.

NRL matches are played in Australia and New Zealand from March to October. Each team plays 24 matches, with the highest placed team at the end of the regular season awarded the minor premiership. This is followed by a finals series contested between the eight highest placed teams from the regular season. The season culminates in the premiership-deciding NRL Grand Final, one of Australia's most popular sporting events. The winners play the World Club Challenge against the champions of the Super League.  The reigning premiers are the Penrith Panthers, having won their fourth premiership at the end of the 2022 season.

History

Origin and establishment 
The New South Wales Rugby League ran the major rugby league competition of New South Wales from its inception in 1908 until 1994. Following the introduction of a new format for interstate rugby league, the State of Origin series in 1980, the decade of the 1980s brought about expansion of the NSWRL premiership, with the introduction of commercial sponsorship, the Winfield Cup, and the addition of non-Sydney-based teams, Canberra and Illawarra in 1982. Although this move brought more interest in the competition statewide in New South Wales, it would spell the beginning of the demise of some of the traditional Sydney-based clubs as well as having a negative effect on the Brisbane Rugby League premiership. Following the 1983 season, Sydney foundation club Newtown Jets were ultimately forced to withdraw from the competition because of financial difficulties.

Further expansion of the league followed in 1988, with another three teams based outside Sydney introduced to the competition; the Newcastle Knights and the first two Queensland teams, the Brisbane Broncos and Gold Coast-Tweed Giants. The Brisbane and Newcastle sides proved to be successful and popular and paved the way towards a push for a truly national competition.

Although a top-flight league, legally parallel to the NSWRL Premiership until the beginning of the truly national ARL Premiership in 1995, the Brisbane Rugby League's history is not officially recorded by the NRL, and it is considered to have been an equal but unrelated first grade competition from 1922-1994.

This was attempted in 1995 with control of the premiership passing from the NSWRFL to the Australian Rugby League (ARL), who invited four more teams from outside NSW to participate in 1995. Ultimately this competition failed, but in its demise the National Rugby League was born, incorporating the traditional Sydney clubs, successfully coercing the Sydney market to follow the newly created national competition.

The prospect of a truly national rugby league competition in addition to the introduction of pay television in Australia attracted the attention of global media organisation, News Corporation, and it followed that professional rugby league was shaken to its very foundations in the mid-1990s with the advent of the Super League war. Initially a conflict over broadcasting rights, it became a dispute as to who controlled the sport and which traditional clubs would survive into the new national era, as News Limited formed their own Super League and admitted some former ARL clubs, poaching players from the original ARL league with high salaries. With twenty-two teams of highly varying quality playing in two competitions that year, crowd attendances and corporate sponsorships were spread very thinly, and many teams found themselves in financial difficulty. The ARL undertook moves to invite the traditional clubs that had moved to the Super League competition back into a re-unified competition. Following a period of negotiation with News Corporation, on 23 September 1997 the ARL announced that it was forming a new company to conduct the competition in 1998. On 7 October News' Manaaki Ranginui announced that he was confident that there would be a single competition in 1998. On 19 December, representatives of clubs affiliated with the Australian Rugby League gathered at the Sydney Football Stadium to decide whether to accept News Limited's offer of a settlement – eventually voting in favour by 36 votes to 4. As a result, in the following months the National Rugby League, jointly owned by the ARL and News Limited, was formed.

It was announced that the inaugural National Rugby League (NRL) season of 1998 would have 20 teams competing, 19 remaining Super League and ARL teams plus the Melbourne Storm, who were created by Super League for their 1998 season. Clubs on both sides of the war were shut down. Super League decided to close the Hunter Mariners and the financially ruined Perth Reds, who were $10 million in debt at the end of 1997, while the ARL decided to close down the South Queensland Crushers, who were also in severe financial trouble. Additionally, at the end of 1998 the NRL decided to close down former Super League club, the Adelaide Rams and former ARL club, the Gold Coast Chargers, despite the Gold Coast franchise being one of the few clubs to make a profit during the Super League war.

1998–2002: Rationalisation
One condition of the peace agreement between the ARL and News Limited was that there would be a 14-team competition in 2000. The 20 clubs that played in 1998 would be assessed on various items such as sponsorship, crowds, on-field success and the like. It was also announced that clubs that merged would receive a large sum of money, as well as a guaranteed position in the 2000 NRL Competition. The St. George Dragons and the Illawarra Steelers were the first clubs to take up the offer, forming the joint-venture St. George Illawarra Dragons at the end of the 1998 season.

The 1999 NRL Grand Final brought about a new official world record attendance for a game of rugby league. 107,999 spectators saw the Melbourne Storm defeat the newly created St. George Illawarra Dragons in the decider at Stadium Australia.

Balmain and Western Suburbs formed the joint-venture club, the Wests Tigers at the end of 1999, while North Sydney and Manly Warringah created the ill-fated Northern Eagles. As part of another image makeover, a number of teams also released new club logos. The most notable of these was the Sydney Roosters, dropping the City section of their name for the 2000 season and beyond. Souths were controversially axed from the competition at the end of 1999 for failing to meet the criteria.

This move was highly controversial and on 12 November 2000 about 80,000 marched in protest at their continued exclusion. South Sydney challenged the decision in the Federal Court claiming that the NRL agreement was exclusionary, intended to unfairly exclude South Sydney, and breached the Trade Practices Act. Justice Paul Finn ruled that the agreement did not specifically exclude any club and dismissed the Rabbitohs' claims for re-instatement into the national competition. Souths appealed this decision and were re-admitted into the competition in 2002.

The Auckland Warriors experienced much financial hardship in the early part of the decade, ultimately collapsing before being resurrected as the New Zealand Warriors for the 2001 season. They made the grand final in 2002 and then again in 2011, losing both encounters to the Sydney Roosters and the re-instated Manly Warringah Sea Eagles, respectively.

In 2001, Australia's largest telecommunications provider Telstra became naming rights sponsor of the NRL, with the competition's name becoming the NRL Telstra Premiership, while in 2002 David Gallop took over the CEO role from David Moffett, and the competition has become more and more popular each season.

In 2001 the NRL Grand Final started to be played on Sunday nights, a shift from the traditional Sunday afternoon slot used for over a decade prior.

2003–2010: Record popularity, expansion and centenary 
The 2003 season was widely regarded as the most successful since the beginning of the National Rugby League in 1998. The Manly Warringah Rugby League Football Club took over the NRL licence from the Northern Eagles franchise, after the financial bankruptcy of the North Sydney faction made the joint-venture untenable. The Penrith Panthers rose from the bottom of the table to win the Premiership, while the Brisbane club returned to Suncorp Stadium mid-year. Season 2004 proved even more successful than 2003, with the North Queensland Cowboys going from 11th position in 2003 to third in 2004, narrowly missing out on a maiden Grand Final berth.

Crowd average records were broken in 2003, 2004 and 2005. In 2005, the NRL reached record levels of popularity for its competition. Total crowds for the competition season almost reached the figures for the last year of the competition conducted by the ARL competition of 1995, prior to the Super League war. The average attendance record remained until 2010. From 2004 to 2005, there was a 39% increase in sponsorship, a 41% increase in merchandise royalties, and a 12% increase in playing participation. In 2005, Business Review Weekly ranked the NRL 497 in revenue of Australian private companies, with revenue of A$66.1m (+7%) with 35 employees. In 2004, Canterbury-Bankstown put a year of turmoil and disgrace at the aftermath of the alleged rape scandal to hold aloft the NRL trophy and give the club their first premiership since 1995. In 2005, a record national audience of 4.1 million tuned in to watch the grand final between the Wests Tigers and the North Queensland Cowboys.

The 2006 NRL Grand Final was won by the Brisbane Broncos over the Melbourne Storm, 15–8. The matchup was a significant milestone in the history of the NRL, as two interstate teams (teams not from New South Wales, the "heartland" of the NRL) contested the grand final for the first time. In the city of Melbourne, whose team was playing in their second grand final, the game's television ratings were higher than in Sydney where the game was played. Crowds were down on 2005, however were better than any other year prior to that.

In its tenth season the NRL returned to having a club based on the Gold Coast, Queensland with the inclusion of the Gold Coast Titans. The Titans were the first professional sporting team to occupy the Gold Coast since 1998, when the Gold Coast Chargers were one of the teams removed during the NRL's rationalisation process between the end of the Super League war and the 2000 season.

The 2007 season saw the return of Monday Night Football and the inclusion of two Friday night games. Both of which turned out to be ratings successes. Another change from the previous seasons was a reduction in the number of byes per team in the season. With an odd number of teams contesting between 2002 and 2006, the draw meant that at least one team would have to have a bye each weekend. With the inclusion of the 16th team for the 2007 season, the National Rugby League had the option of reverting to back to the system used between 2000 and 2001 where every team played each round. That system was not used however, with teams were given just a single bye during the year, grouped in periods that will assist clubs around representative fixtures.

The opening round saw two matches at Brisbane's Suncorp Stadium, the first featuring reigning champions Brisbane against fellow Queensland side North Queensland, while the second match featured the new club, the Gold Coast playing St. George Illawarra. The weather during the middle of the season was less than ideal, with cyclonic conditions severely affecting many NRL games played in Sydney and Newcastle.

The 2007 finals series saw the South Sydney Rabbitohs return to finals football for the first time in decades. The season culminated on 30 September 2007, with the grand final contested between Manly and Melbourne. Melbourne won the title 34–8 and the grand final achieved the honour of being the most watched television show in Australia in 2007.

Throughout 2008, the NRL celebrated 100 years since rugby league was introduced into Australia, with several initiatives to recognise the important milestone, including an extensive marketing campaign called the 'Centenary of Rugby League'. The competition began in March, with a special Heritage round held in mid-April, coinciding with the first round of competition played in 1908.

At a Gala event on 17 April 2008 the Team of the Century was announced, being:

 Full-back: Clive Churchill
 Wingers: Ken Irvine, Brian Bevan
 Centres: Reg Gasnier, Mal Meninga
 Five-eighth: Wally Lewis
 Half-back: Andrew Johns
 Lock: John Raper

 Second Row: Norm Provan, Ron Coote
 Props: Arthur Beetson, Duncan Hall
 Hooker: Noel Kelly
 Reserves: Graeme Langlands, Dally Messenger, Bob Fulton, Frank Burge
 Coach: Jack Gibson.

For the second year in a row, the grand final was played between the Melbourne Storm and the Manly Warringah Sea Eagles, in the NRL's first ever twilight decider. The Manly club took out the premiership game 40–0, setting the record for the highest winning margin in a Grand Final (although the club formerly known as St. George Dragons were beaten 38–0 in 1975 and using the modern point scale of 4-point tries, this would amount to 46–0.) Furthermore, it was the first time a team had been kept scoreless in a Grand Final since 1978.

The 2009 season marked the beginning of the second century of rugby league in Australia.
The grand final that year was played between the Parramatta Eels and once again Melbourne Storm. Melbourne defeated Parramatta 23 – 16 to win the premiership to make it two premierships out of the last four grand finals for the Melbourne side.

In 2010 the Inaugural All Stars Match was held on 13 February, in conjunction with the Sorry Day reconciliation anniversary to promote rugby league's long association and involvement with the Aboriginal community. The first match saw the Indigenous All Stars beat the NRL All Stars 16–12. The success of this event has seen it become a recurring fixture on the rugby league calendar with Queensland awarded the hosting rights for the next three years.

The 29th State of Origin series was also played featuring the world's first live free-to-air 3D TV broadcast. Queensland later made further history by winning an unprecedented fifth series in a row, and winning the 2010 series by a scoreline of 3–0, their first Origin whitewash since 1995.

In 2010 the NRL set a record total season average attendance of 17,367 per game and a record total season aggregate attendance of 3,490,778.

During the 2010 finals series, the second qualifying match between the Wests Tigers and Sydney Roosters became the first McIntyre system final to go into extra time, with the One Hundred Minute Epic described in media circles as one of the greatest of the modern era.

The 2010 Grand Final was played between the St. George Illawarra Dragons and the Sydney Roosters. St. George Illawarra won 32–8. This was the first premiership won by the club in its eleven-year existence and the first time in 31 years for the St. George part of the joint venture.

2010–2019: Establishment of the ARLC
After several years of preparation and build up, on 14 December 2010 the Australian Rugby League and News Corporation agreed upon a constitutional framework paving the way for the establishment of a new and independent commission to govern the sport in Australia. The negotiations of such a framework became drawn out over establishing details, primarily of sponsorship, media rights, funding of state bodies, funding of the Melbourne Storm, debate over News Ltd private ownership of clubs, and also of individual appointments to the new body.
The 2011 Grand Final was contested between the Manly-Warringah Sea Eagles and the New Zealand Warriors. This was the second grand final involving the New Zealand Warriors. Manly recorded a 24–10 win claiming their second premiership under head coach Des Hasler.

On 10 February 2012, the independent commission, known as the Australian Rugby League Commission assumed control of all levels of the game, replacing former state based boards and assuming full control of the NRL from the NRL partnership (comprising the previous ARL board and News Limited).
The current Chairman is Peter V'landys AM.  The 2012 Grand Final involved the Canterbury-Bankstown Bulldogs and the Melbourne Storm, this was the first time since 2008 that the first and second placed teams contested the grand final. The Melbourne Storm recorded a 14–4 victory thus achieving their second premiership and claiming some vengeance for the stripped premierships.

The 2013 season saw the resurgence of foundation clubs the Sydney Roosters and the South Sydney Rabbitohs with both clubs finishing first and second place respectively. The NRL was also left with a black eye after the Cronulla-Sutherland Sharks were caught using performance-enhancing substances by ASADA dating back to 2011. The 2013 Grand Final was played between the Sydney Roosters and the Manly-Warringah Sea Eagles with the Roosters recording a 26–18 victory.

The 2014 season started with the introduction of the Auckland Nines and was marred by the handing down of a million dollar fine to the Cronulla-Sutherland Sharks for their role in the ASADA scandal while head coach Shane Flanagan was suspended for the entirety of the 2014 season. The 2014 Grand Final was contested by the South Sydney Rabbitohs and the Canterbury-Bankstown Bulldogs. This was South Sydney's first grand final appearance since 1971. South Sydney would break their 43-year premiership drought with a 30–6 victory.

The 2015 season saw the return of the Queensland juggernauts, The North Queensland Cowboys and the Brisbane Broncos who would finish inside the top four and contest the 2015 Grand Final. The 2015 Grand Final is considered by many to be the greatest grand final of all time as a high intensity match ended in dramatic circumstances when North Queensland scored as the full-time siren sounded. Johnathan Thurston would miss the conversion from the sideline as the ball hit the post thus sending the match into golden point, the first golden point grand final. Ben Hunt would drop the ball on the kick-off and hand the North Queensland side the chance to win which was converted as Johnathan Thurston successfully kicked a field goal to win the match 17–16.

The 2016 season saw the Melbourne Storm return to the minor premiership position while the Canberra Raiders returned to the top four for the first time since the 2003. The Cronulla-Sutherland Sharks and reigning premiers North Queensland would fill out the top four. The season continued a trend of the minor premiership not being decided to the final round, the fourth consecutive year. The 2016 Grand Final was contested between the Melbourne Storm and the Cronulla-Sutherland Sharks, it was the Cronulla's fourth grand final appearance while it was the seventh for the Melbourne club. The match was a tight affair and was not settled until after the siren had sounded. The Cronulla-Sutherland claimed their first premiership ending a famous 49-year drought by a score of 14–12.

Following the success generated by the 2017 Women's Rugby League World Cup, a national women's league was established, and the first season commenced in September 2018 comprising four clubs aligned to existing NRL clubs.

2020–present: COVID affected seasons and further expansion
On 22 March 2020, during the COVID-19 pandemic, the NRL became one of the last major sports in the world to continue playing games. The other major Australian football code, the Australian Football League (AFL), announced suspension of their season on that day. AFL's decision came as the Australian federal government announced a ban on "non essential" travel and closing of pubs, clubs and other venues. AFL leaders commented "As a community and as a code we all need to take the unprecedented and required actions to get through this together." However, the NRL announced it would be moving forward with their season. The decision prompted a wave of condemnation online, including from Australian personalities and sport people. The following day after Queensland closed its borders, the NRL announced that the season would have to be suspended indefinitely. It was feared that some teams would not survive this period without income, as it was foreseen as a financial catastrophe.

On 9 April 2020, ARL Commissioner Wayne Pearce announced the NRL would return on 28 May. The announcement came under heavy criticism from the Government of New South Wales and health officials, with Premier Gladys Berejiklian saying she had not approved a return. However, the NRL released documents signed by NSW Police Commissioner Mick Fuller, showing approval for the NRL to continue without crowds. The competition ended up kicking off on that date, with the Parramatta Eels defeating the Brisbane Broncos 34–6 at Suncorp Stadium behind closed doors. The match drew the highest TV ratings for a regular season game since 2014. The AFL returned over two weeks later than the NRL, who were the first sport to return to play worldwide that actually ceased play.

In October 2021, after months of speculation, the NRL and the ARLC announced that the competition would expand to 17 teams, with the admission of the Dolphins for the 2023 season. The Dolphins are based in the far northern-suburb of Redcliffe, near Brisbane.

Governance
Since the NRL commenced in 1998 there have been six CEOs, they are:

1998 – 1999: Neil Whittaker
1999 – 2001: David Moffett
2002 – 2012: David Gallop
2012 – 2015: David Smith
2016 – 2020: Todd Greenberg
2020 – present: Andrew Abdo
Since the Australian Rugby League Commission was inaugurated in 2012, there have been three chairmen:

 2012 – 2017: John Grant
 2017 – 2019: Peter Beattie 
 2019 – present: Peter V'landys

Teams

The NRL currently consists of seventeen clubs. Nine clubs are based within the Greater Sydney area (including one that also represents the Illawarra region south of Sydney), another in regional New South Wales, four in Queensland, and one each in Victoria, the Australian Capital Territory, and New Zealand. The league operates on a single group system, with no divisions or conferences and no relegation or promotion.

A total of twenty-three clubs have played in the NRL since its first season in 1998. Eleven clubs have been members for every season.

Two of the clubs currently in the NRL were founded in 1908, the first year of rugby league competition in Australia: the Sydney Roosters (founded as 'Eastern Suburbs') and the South Sydney Rabbitohs. The Wests Tigers are a merger of two other foundation clubs: The Western Suburbs Magpies and the Balmain Tigers.

Current clubs

Former teams

Season structure

Pre-season 

The NRL pre season typically begins in February and ends in early March. Clubs generally use this time to organise trial matches to test playing combinations. However, some clubs play for trophies: Easts and Wests play for the Foundation Cup while South Sydney and St. George Illawarra play for the Charity Shield. The trials are typically played in cities and towns that normally don't host NRL matches. In the past a World Sevens rugby league football tournament has been hosted, however this was scrapped due to injury concerns.

All Stars match

Beginning in 2010, the All Stars match has become a major fixture in the NRL preseason. The teams are chosen via public voting and the two sides play for the Arthur Beetson Trophy. In 2018, the game was temporarily removed from the calendar due to the World Cup being played the previous year citing an excessive player workload.  The match returned in 2019 and was hosted in Melbourne with the Australian Indigenous All Stars taking on the New Zealand Maori All Stars.

NRL Nines

In 2014, the inaugural rugby league nines tournament took place, featuring all sixteen NRL clubs. It was initially staged at Eden Park, Auckland, New Zealand. This two-day tournament has now become a regular fixture, taking place in February each year. Women's nines games were also fixtured alongside the main tournament between the Australian and New Zealand women's teams, however now feature the four NRLW teams. In 2018 the tournament was removed from the calendar due to the World Cup being played the previous year citing an excessive player workload, however, it was brought back in 2020.

World Club Challenge

The World Club Challenge is an annual pre-season match played between the champion of the National Rugby League and the champion of the Super League.  The first match of its kind was the 1976 World Club Challenge and it was then played sporadically throughout the late 80s and 90s, including a one off Super League tournament in 1997, before becoming a regular annual pre-season fixture since 2000.

In 2015, the competition was expanded to include two exhibition games before the Challenge game. This expanded series, called the World Club Series, ran from 2015 to 2017. The first two Series saw the leagues' champions joined by two invited teams from each league, resulting in a three-game series. Each invited team represented their league in a single game, played in the days leading up to the usual Challenge match. In 2017, only one invited team from each league participated, with the NRL citing tight schedules, distant travel and long seasons as an impediment to the Series. In 2018 the series was cancelled, with only the usual Challenge match played and has continued as a single match since.

Premiership rounds

As rugby league is a winter sport in Australia, the NRL premiership season begins in early March, with games played every weekend for 27 weeks, until the start of September. In most rounds, one match is played on Thursday night, two on Friday night, three on Saturday and two on Sunday. Special themed weeks include ANZAC Round, Heritage Round, Women in League Round, Retro Round, Beanies for Brain Cancer round and Rivalry Round. Separate trophies between rival teams are also presented throughout the season. In 2019, the NRL introduced Magic Round, which featured all sixteen teams playing at Suncorp Stadium in Brisbane over the weekend. It was deemed a success and has now been a scheduled annual event since.

Teams receive two competition points for a win, and one point for a draw. The bye also receives two points; a loss, no points. Teams on the ladder are ranked by competition points, then match points differential (for and against) and points percentage are used to separate teams with equal competition points. At the end of the regular season, the club which is ranked highest on the ladder is declared minor premiers.

Representative season
As well as playing for their club in the premiership, NRL players are regularly selected to play in a number of representative competitions that are conducted throughout each season. The representative season is generally considered to be a period of rugby league that runs from about the middle of April until the middle of July each year. Up until the 2017 season the fixtures took into account the following games:

 The annual Anzac Test between Australia and New Zealand (Early to mid April)
 The New South Wales City vs Country Origin match (Early to mid April, same weekend as the Anzac Test)
 The Pacific Tests, played on the same weekend as the Anzac Test and City vs Country Origin, these games feature matches placed between Fiji, Samoa, Papua New Guinea and Tonga
 The three match State of Origin series (June – July)

From 2018, the season was altered to create a shorter workload for players. A number of representative games were scrapped and timing changed therefore the representative season was changed to include:

 The Pacific Tests, played on the same weekend as the second State of Origin game
 The three match State of Origin series (June – July) with the second game featuring on a standalone weekend.

Other representative matches that can occur later in the year are:
 The Prime Minister's XIII match in Papua New Guinea
 The Four Nations tournament – Australia, New Zealand and England plus another qualifier
 The quadrennial World Cup tournament
 Additional test Matches between Australia and New Zealand.
 The Rugby League World Cup 9s

Finals series
The eight highest placed teams at the end of the regular season compete in the finals series. The system consists of a number of games between the top eight teams over four weeks in September, until only two teams remain. These two teams then contest the grand final, which is usually played on the first Sunday of October. From 1998 to 2011, the NRL used the McIntyre final eight system but with the introduction of the ARLC, it was decided to change to the current format which was perceived as fairer for teams finishing in the Top 4.

Grand final

The NRL Grand Final, which determines the season's premiers, is one of Australia's major sporting events and is one of the largest attended club championship events in the world. It has been contested at Sydney's Stadium Australia each year since 1999, with the exception of 2021 when it was played at Brisbane's Suncorp Stadium due to the COVID pandemic. The first year it was held at Stadium Australia, the NRL Grand Final broke the record for attendance at an Australian rugby league game, with 107,999 people attending.

The Grand Final had traditionally been played on Sunday afternoons, shifting to 8 pm in 2001, then to 7 pm thereafter.  However, from 2008, a compromise was reached between official broadcaster Nine Network's preferred starting time and the afternoon starting time of 3 pm, with the grand final beginning at 5 pm AEST.

Each year the NRL Grand Final Breakfast, a function that is attended by both teams, hundreds of guests and screened live on Australian television is held during the week before the game.

The game itself is usually preceded by an opening ceremony featuring entertainment and the singing of the national anthem by well-known Australasian and international musical acts. After the pre-game entertainment it is traditional for the NRL trophy to be delivered to the field by an Australian Army helicopter shortly before kick off.

At the conclusion of the grand final there is a presentation ceremony where the winning team are awarded premiership rings. The player judged to be the man-of-the-match by the Australian national team selectors is awarded the prestigious Clive Churchill Medal and the Prime Minister of Australia is typically on-hand to hand the trophy to the winning captain.

In 2010 the Government of New South Wales secured the grand final for Stadium Australia until 2022 for $45 million.

Grand finals

Notes
a: Melbourne Storm were stripped of their 2007, 2009 premiership titles and their 2006, 2007, 2008 minor premiership titles due to their breach of the salary cap. The titles were withheld by the NRL rather than awarding them to the runners up.

Results

Notes
 These stats NRL era only (1998 to present)
Ranking: Teams are ranked in order of premierships won, grand final runners up then minor premierships won. To see the complete list of premiers in Australian Rugby League, see List of National Rugby League Premiers.

Players
National Rugby League footballers are among Australasia's most famous athletes, commanding multimillion-dollar playing contracts and sponsorship deals. Each club in the NRL has a "top squad" of twenty-five players, who are signed under a salary cap. For the most part, the players who play in NRL matches are sourced from these top squads. During a season the need may arise for a club to use players outside these 25, in which case players are usually sourced from the club's corresponding NRL Under-20s team or a feeder club in the New South Wales Cup or Queensland Cup.

Demographics
In the recent years, the influence of Polynesian players on the NRL has grown, with figures from the 2011 season showing that 35% of NRL players and over 45% of NRL Under-20s players are of Polynesian background. This increase in Polynesian players has been blamed for the decline of Indigenous players, dropping from 21% in the 1990s to 11% for the 2009 season.

The first Indigenous Australian to play in the NSWRL/NRL was New South Wales Rugby League premiership player George Green, who debuted in 1909. Since that time, many high-profile indigenous athletes have played in the competition, including Arthur Beetson (the first Aboriginal person to captain an Australian national team in any sport) and former Test match representatives Johnathan Thurston and Greg Inglis.

At the elite level of the game, Indigenous Australians represented 35% of the roster for the Kangaroos, 21% of players at the 2012 State of Origin series, 12% of NRL players and a further 8% of the NRL Under-20s players. By way of comparison, 2.3% of the Australian population identified themselves as Indigenous in the 2006 Australian census.

To celebrate the strong Indigenous ties to the game, the NRL holds a preseason All Stars game, featuring a team made up of Indigenous Australians playing a publicly voted team consisting of the non-Indigenous players, and an Indigenous Leadership Group has formed, consisting of the game's elite Indigenous players. The Leadership Group hosts regular multi-day camps where all Indigenous NRL players are invited to learn more about Indigenous culture.

Both the All Stars match and the Leadership Group were ideas pioneered by former player Preston Campbell, with the All Stars man of the match receiving the Preston Campbell medal.

Salary cap

A salary cap was introduced to the NSWRL in 1990 to even the playing field of teams in the Winfield Cup.
As of 2013 the club grant is $7.1 million which covers the salary cap of $5.85 million and a minimum wage for $80,000 for the top twenty-five players at each club. The salary cap will increase to $6.3 million in 2014, $6.55 million in 2015, $6.8 million by 2016 and $7 million in 2017.

The cap is actively policed and penalties for clubs found to have breached the NRL salary cap regulations include fines of lesser of half the amount involved or $500,000 and/or deduction of premiership points. For example, six clubs were fined for minor infractions in 2003. These infractions are usually technical in nature, and can sometimes be affected by third-party factors such as loss of sponsorship revenue affecting an allowance. During the 2007 season the NRL implemented ways of creating a fair and more beneficial cap for players and clubs.

In 2010, following the Melbourne Storm salary cap scandal, the NRL introduced requirements for players and their agents to sign statutory declarations pledging their contracts comply with salary cap regulations, where previously only club chairmen and chief executives did so for biannual salary cap audits.

Major breaches of the cap

In 2002, the Bulldogs were fined the maximum of $500,000 and deducted all 37 premiership points received during the season after it was found that they had committed serious and systematic breaches of the salary cap totalling $2.13 million over the past three years, including $750,000 in 2001 and $920,000 in 2002; these were described by NRL chief executive David Gallop as "exceptional in both its size and its deliberate and ongoing nature". The points penalty meant that the club won the 2002 wooden spoon (Souths would have finished last if not for the breaches), and as the club had been leading the competition table prior to the imposition of the penalties, this was a shattering outcome for the club and its fans. Two senior club officials were jailed for fraud as a result of these breaches.

In 2005, the New Zealand Warriors were fined $430,000 and were ordered to start the 2006 season with a four premiership point deficit and cut their payroll by $450,000 after club officials revealed that their former management had exceeded the salary cap by $1.1 million over the last two years. The points penalty meant that the Warriors missed a finals berth in 2006.

On 22 April 2010, following revelations by an internal whistleblower and investigation by the NRL, Storm officials revealed that the club had committed serious and systematic breaches of the salary cap regulations between 2006 and 2010 by running a well-organized dual contract and bookkeeping system that concealed a total of $3.78 million in payments made to players outside of the salary cap from the NRL. This included: $303,000 in 2006, $459,000 in 2007, $957,000 in 2008, $1.021 million in 2009 and $1.04 million in 2010. As a result, the club was stripped of the 2007 and 2009 premierships, 2006–2008 minor premierships and the following year, the 2010 World Club Challenge trophy. They were also fined a then Australian sporting record of $1.689 million ($1.1 million in NRL prize money which was equally distributed between the remaining 15 clubs, $89,000 in prize money from the World Club Challenge which was distributed to the Leeds Rhinos, and a maximum of $500,000 for breaching the salary cap regulations). In addition they were ordered to cut their payroll by $1.0125 million, deducted all eight premiership points received during the 2010 season and barred from receiving premiership points for the remainder of the 2010 season. The points penalty meant that the club won the 2010 wooden spoon. The former directors attempted unsuccessful legal action against the penalties which collapsed, and the club also had to pay the NRLs legal costs. The matter was also referred to ASIC, the Australian Tax Office, the Victorian State Revenue Office, and the Victoria Police to investigate possible fraud however by May 2011 these investigations were closed. The players themselves were found to have not done anything wrong during this time so individual awards are recognised in addition, the players were still eligible for Test/State of Origin selection.

Prior to the start of the 2016 NRL season, the Parramatta Eels faced the prospect with starting the season on −4 points due to salary cap indiscretions in 2015, however the NRL was satisfied with governance changes at the Eels and no points were deducted. However, it was revealed in March that third-party payments had been made by several companies to several players, which is strictly prohibited in the NRL. On 3 May 2016, NRL CEO Todd Greenberg announced that the club would be docked the twelve competition points they have accrued so far this season, as well as fined $1 million and stripped of the 2016 NRL Auckland Nines title it won in February. In addition, the NRL also announced that the Eels would not be able to accrue any further competition points until they fall under the salary cap, which they were reported to be $500,000 over as of 3 May 2016. Five officials, including chairman Steve Sharp, deputy chairman Tom Issa, director Peter Serrao, chief executive John Boulous and football manager Daniel Anderson, were also sacked. On 9 July, after over 2 months of club officials contesting the preliminary penalties, Parramatta were handed their punishment with the addition of their for/against points tally accumulated from rounds 1–9 being deducted.

In 2018, the Manly-Warringah Sea Eagles were fined $750,000, two officials (Neil Bare and Joe Kelly were suspended and a $660,000 penalty was applied to the salary cap for 2018 and the next year for breaches of the salary cap). Manly was proved by the NRL chief executive that third-party payments and deals were made to attract more players to the club.

Judiciary and Integrity Unit

The NRL Judiciary is made up of former players who convene in three-man panels to rule on on-field incidents. The judiciary is currently chaired by Wollongong district court judge Paul Conlon and made up of former players Mal Cochrane, Michael Buettner, Bradley Clyde, Sean Garlick, Don McKinnon and Bob Lindner.

An integrity Unit was formed on 7 February 2013 and is headed by former Federal Court judge Tony Whitlam.

Awards

Provan-Summons trophy 

The Provan-Summons trophy is the NRL's main prize, awarded to the team that wins the premiership. Its sculptured design is similar to the Winfield Cup trophy, which was introduced for the 1982 NSWRFL season. It is a three-dimensional cast of a famous photo called The Gladiators, which depicts a mud-soaked Norm Provan of St. George and Arthur Summons of Western Suburbs embracing after the 1963 NSWRFL season's Grand Final. It was not officially named the Provan-Summons Trophy until 2013, the 50th anniversary of the 1963 Grand Final. The trophy is awarded following each grand final to the captain of the winning club. The trophy was mysteriously broken during grand final celebrations in 2021.

Each player from the premiership winning side are also awarded Premiership Rings.

J. J. Giltinan Shield
Created in 1951, the J. J. Giltinan Shield is awarded to the club ranked highest on the NRL ladder after the premiership season concludes. Typically this team is known as the minor premiers.

Clive Churchill medal
The Clive Churchill Medal is awarded to the most outstanding player in a grand final. It is named after former Australian fullback Clive Churchill.

Dally M awards
The Dally M Medal is the highlight of the Dally M Awards and was named after Henry Herbert 'Dally' Messenger, who was instrumental in the establishment of rugby league football in Australia.
The awards were introduced in 1980 by News Limited.
The Dally M has been the official player-of-the-year award, and the highest individual honour in Australian rugby league, since the unification of the game in 1998. Before 1998 the highest award was the Rothmans Medal.

The medal is awarded, usually by the Australian Prime Minister, at the annual Dally M Awards night.
As well as honouring the best and fairest player of the year, the Dally M awards recognise the premier player in each position, the best coach and the most outstanding rookie of the season.

The Immortals
Originally The Immortals were Four players named by the sport's major Australian magazine Rugby League Week as the nation's greatest ever.

Established in 1981, the group of four former Test captains: , Clive Churchill, Bob Fulton, Reg Gasnier, Johnny Raper and were those appointed by Rugby League Week between 1981 and 2012. Wally Lewis, Graeme Langlands added in 1999 Arthur Beetson 2003 Andrew Johns 2012

Following the demise of Rugby League Week, the Australian Rugby League Commission took ownership of The Immortals concept and expanded the group on 1 August 2018 by inclusion of Mal Meninga, Norm Provan, Frank Burge, Dave Brown and Dally Messenger.

Queensland Rugby League's Team of the Century 
The Queensland Rugby League's Team of the Century is a team that consisted of the greatest rugby league players from 1909 to 2008. This team was picked by six judges in 2008 from a list of 100 nominated players.

New South Wales Rugby League's Team of the Century 
The New South Wales Rugby League's Team of the Century is a team that consisted of the greatest rugby league players from 1908 to 2007.

Audience

The 2022 season rated 134.447 million viewers in Australia, at an average viewership of 620,000 per game, with a roughly 60/40 split between viewers when games are broadcast both free-to-air on Nine and subscription viewers on Fox League and Kayo Sports.

The 2022 season also attracted 3,265,911 spectators through the gates, at an average of 16,248 per match.

Media coverage

Television

ANZ and Pacific 
Within Australia all matches are broadcast on both the Nine Network and Fox Sports through 2027. The Fox Sports contract was signed in May 2020 and the NRL extended their contract with Nine in December 2021 to match the length of the contract with Fox Sports through 2027. In New Zealand all matches, including representative fixtures such as the All Stars Match and the State of Origin series, are shown live on Sky Sport. Prime broadcasts select games live in New Zealand starting from the 2022 season, and will continue to broadcast every Warriors match on delay.

Detailed Australian coverage

By Matchday
 Thursday Night Football is broadcast live on the Nine Network and simulcast on Fox League and Kayo. Kickoff is at 7:50pm.
 Friday Night Football consists of 2 matches. The first match kicks off at 6:00pm and is broadcast live on Fox League. The second match kicks off at 7:55pm and is broadcast live on the Nine Network and simulcast on Fox League and Kayo.
 Super Saturday consists of three matches. The first match kicks off at 3:00pm, the second match kicks off at 5:30pm and the third match kicks off at 7:35pm. All three matches are broadcast live on Fox League and are simulcast live on Kayo. During the final five rounds of the year, the 7:35pm match is also simulcast on Nine.
 NRL Sunday Ticket consists of two matches. The first match kicks off at 2:00pm and is broadcast live on Fox League and Kayo. The second match kicks off at 4:10pm and is broadcast live on the Nine Network and simulcasted on Fox League and Kayo. During daylight savings, the 2:00pm game is moved to 6:10pm.

By Network
 Fox League and Kayo televise all matches live and commercial free (excluding the grand final).
 Nine Network televises the Thursday night game, the second Friday night game and the second Sunday afternoon game (first in daylight savings), as well as the last five Saturday 7:30pm games of the year and all matches of the finals series including the NRL Grand Final.
 The State of Origin series is televised exclusively live on the Nine Network, with extensive pre-game and post-game coverage, starting at 7:00pm.
 The NRL Grand Final televised exclusively live on the Nine Network. Since 2013, the match has kicked off at 7:30pm

Source:

NRL-related television programmes 
In Australia there are television shows dedicated to discussing the NRL. The programmes are listed in order of the day and time viewed in their primary broadcast market:

 NRL 360 (Mondays-Wednesdays 6:30 pm on Fox League 502). Hosted by Braith Anasta and Paul Kent.
 Sunday Night with Matty Johns (following Sunday Football on Fox League 502). Hosted by Matthew Johns.
 The Fan (Tuesdays 7:30 pm on Fox League 502). Hosted by Andrew Voss.
 The Late Show with Matty Johns (Thursdays 10:00 pm on Fox League 502). Hosted by Matthew Johns.
 League Legends (Sundays 6:30pm on Fox League 502). Hosted by Tim Sheridan. (Broadcast during the off-season)
 The Sunday Footy Show (Sunday 11.00 am on Channel Nine): a recap of Thursday, Friday and Saturday's games, and preview of Sunday's games.
 100% Footy (Mondays 10:30pm on Channel 9): A recap of the weekend results along with topical discussions on the major issues surrounding the game. Hosted by James Bracey.
 Over The Black Dot (Wednesdays 8:30pm on NITV): An Indigenous Australian perspective on the NRL featuring highlights, discussion and interviews
 Bloke in a Bar (Mondays, Wednesdays at 3:00pm on Youtube). Hosted by Denan Kemp

Former shows:

 Barefoot Sports (Thursday 8:30 pm on NITV) Hosted by Brad Cooke and formerly known as The Barefoot Rugby League Show.
 One Week at a Time (Mondays, at 9:30 pm, on One), recapping the weekend games
 The Game Plan (Thursday 8:30 pm, on Channel Ten) Hosted by Steve Roach, Joel Caine and Andrew Moore.
 The Matty Johns Show (Thursdays, 7.30 pm on Channel Seven) A more sketch-and-regular-segment-oriented version of The Footy Show and The Game Plan, not related to Monday Night with Matty Johns.
 The Sunday Roast (Sunday Midday on Channel Nine) Now incorporated into the Sunday Footy Show.
 NRL Full-time, a weekly half-hour highlights show for the UK audience.
 On the Couch with Sterlo
 League Life (Wednesdays 7:30pm on Fox League 502). Hosted by Yvonne Sampson.
 Queenslanders Only (Wednesdays 8:00pm on Fox League 502). Hosted by Hannah Hollis.  (Airs at 7:00pm Queensland time during the month of March due to NSW Daylight Saving Time)
 Narrow World of Sports (Fridays 10:00pm on Fox League 502). Hosted by James 'The Professor' Rochford.

NZ Coverage 
 Sky Sport: All games live on Sky Sport 4 including State of Origin and the grand final.
 Prime: New Zealand Warriors games on delay. Some select matches live.
 Three: Select State of Origin games live

Pacific 
In most Pacific countries, all matches are broadcast on Digicel and other networks in these four countries. Such as in Fiji, where it is on Mai TV and in PNG, where it is on TVWan.

Outside ANZ and Pacific 
The NRL is also available to the rest of the world.

Internet 
Outside of Australia, New Zealand, and the Pacific Islands, all matches are currently available in high definition on the subscription streaming service Watch NRL which operates through its website and a dedicated app. Watch NRL is operated by Fox Sports Australia.

A selection of classic NRL games is available for free worldwide on the league's website.

Radio

Australia
The NRL has several exclusive rights partners to broadcast matches live via radio nationwide. FM coverage is provided by Triple M while AM coverage is contracted to ABC Local Radio and 2GB. All radio coverage is available to be streamed live from the NRL website.

2GB has the commercial rights to four matches per week, covering the game through the Continuous Call Team program. 2GB also air representative games, as well as all matches throughout the finals series, and all three matches on Grand Final day. The coverage is networked to stations across the country, typically those owned by Southern Cross Media Group, Grant Broadcasters and other station groups on Nine Radio.

ABC Local Radio has the rights to seven NRL matches per week in the Australian Capital Territory, Queensland and New South Wales.

Triple M has exclusive access to Thursday night, Saturday 4 pm and Sunday night matches and is broadcast on commercial stations across the country. Triple M also broadcast the State of Origin series, the finals series and the grand final.

2SM formerly held the rights to air Thursday Night and Sunday 4pm games via NRL Nation. These games were also aired across their affiliates across NSW. 2UE also formerly held rights to matches.

Current Broadcasters:
Triple M: Four games live per week (includes all Cowboys, Raiders, Knights and Titans home game live on home stations)
2GB: Four games live per week (includes Sunday 4:00pm exclusive)
ABC: Seven games live per week

Print 
Big League was the competition's official publication, released Thursday and produced by News Magazines. The publication ceased operations in 2020 leaving the game without an official program.

LeagueUnlimited's Front Row Magazine provides an unofficial match program each week.

Theme songs 

 1985–1988: The Boys Are Back in Town – Thin Lizzy
 1989: What You Get Is What You See – Tina Turner
 1990–1995: Simply The Best – Tina Turner
 1997 (SL): Two Tribes – Frankie Goes to Hollywood
 1997 (ARL): It's My Game – NSWRL
 1998: Tubthumping – Chumbawamba
 1999: Blow That Whistle – Thomas Keneally

 2000: What A Game – Tom Jones
 2001: Racing Car Noises over Action Highlights
 2003–2007: That's My Team – Hoodoo Gurus
 2008: Centenary of Rugby League Campaign
 2009: Feels Like Woah – Wes Carr
 2010: Social Currency – Children Collide
 2011–2012: This Is Our House – Bon Jovi

 2013: Something's Got a Hold on Me – Jessica Mauboy
 2014: My Songs Know What You Did in the Dark – Fall Out Boy
 2015: Let Me Entertain You – Robbie Williams
 2016: History Happens
 2017: Let's Make History
 2018: Whatever It Takes – Imagine Dragons
 2019: High Hopes – Panic! at the Disco
 2020: The Best – Tina Turner

Video games 

There have been many top selling video games made for the Australian rugby league market. The games below are sorted by year released.
 E.T.'s Rugby League, named for Andrew Ettingshausen, was released on Amiga in 1992.
 Australian Rugby League (1995) for Sega Mega Drive
 ARL '96 was a PC game published by EA Sports for the 1996 season.
 Rugby League (2003) for Microsoft Windows, PlayStation 2, and Xbox
 Rugby League 2 (2005) for Microsoft Windows, PlayStation 2, and Xbox
 Rugby League 2: World Cup Edition (2008) for PlayStation 2
 NRL Mascot Mania (2009) for Nintendo DS
 Rugby League Challenge (2009) for PlayStation Portable
 Rugby League 3 (2010) for Wii
 Rugby League Live (2010) for PlayStation 3 Xbox 360; (2011) for Microsoft Windows
 Rugby League Live 2 (2012) for PlayStation 3 and Xbox 360
 Rugby League Legends (2012) iOS
 Rugby League Live 2: World Cup Edition (2013) for PlayStation 3 and Xbox 360
 Rugby League Live 3 (2015) for Steam, PlayStation 3, Xbox 360, PlayStation 4 and Xbox One
 Rugby League Live 4 (2017) for Steam, PlayStation 3, Xbox 360, PlayStation 4 and Xbox One
 Rugby League Live 4 World Cup Edition (2017) for Steam, PlayStation 3, Xbox 360, PlayStation 4 and Xbox One

Cheerleading 

Most NRL teams have a squad of dancers for cheerleading that are usually involved in dancing, charity work, fundraisers, and modelling. Some Notable NRL cheerleaders are Jennifer Hawkins for the Newcastle Knights, Chloe Butler for the Emeralds and Tabrett Bethell for the Cronulla Sharks Mermaids.

Cheer squads

Note: The Wests Tigers, South Sydney Rabbitohs and Dolphins do not have active cheer squads.

Records

Official NRL statistics encompass all first grade competitions, namely the New South Wales Rugby League, Australian Rugby League, Super League, and the present day NRL.

Team
 Most premierships – 21 South Sydney Rabbitohs
 Most minor premierships – 20 Sydney Roosters
 Most premierships in a row – 11 St George
 Most wooden spoons – 17 Western Suburbs Magpies
 Highest score in a game – 91, St. George against Canterbury (1935)
 Largest winning margin in a game – 85, St. George against Canterbury (1935)
 Longest winning streak – 19 matches, Eastern Suburbs Roosters (1975); Melbourne Storm (2021)
 Longest undefeated streak – 35 matches, Eastern Suburbs (1935–1938)
 Longest losing streak- 42 matches, University (1934–1936)

Individual
 Most games played – Cameron Smith 430 games
 Leading pointscorer – Cameron Smith 2,810 points (48 tries, 1307 goals, 4 field goals)
 Leading tryscorer – Ken Irvine, 212 tries
 Most points in a Full Season – including Finals 342, Hazem El Masri (16 tries, 139 goals) (2004)
 Most points in a Regular Season 300, Reuben Garrick (21 tries, 110 goals) (2021)
 Most tries in a season 38, Dave Brown (1935)
 Most points in a game 45, Dave Brown (1935).
 Most tries in a game 8, Frank Burge (1920)

Coaches
(* = interim coach)

Premiership Winning Coaches (NRL Era)

Match officials 

On-Field Match Officials

 Grant Atkins
 Chris Butler
 Ben Cummins
 Adam Gee
 Peter Gough
 Liam Kennedy
 Ashley Klein
 Ziggy Przeklasa-Adamski
 Todd Smith
 Chris Sutton
 Gerard Sutton

Sideline Officials
 Kasey Badger
 Darian Furner
 Phil Henderson
 Keiren Irons
 Liam Kennedy
 Nick Morel
 David Munro
 Matt Noyen
 Drew Oultram
 Cameron Paddy
 Ziggy Przeklasa-Adamski
 Wyatt Raymond
 Belinda Sharpe
 Jon Stone
 Michael Wise

Bunker Review Officials (Video Referees)
 Grant Atkins (also an on-field match official)
 Kasey Badger (also an on-field match official)
 Steve Chiddy*
 Adam Gee (also an on-field match official)
 Ashley Klein (also an on-field match official)
Chris Butler (also an on-field match official)
Matt Noyen (also an on-field match official)
 Alan Shortall
 Gerard Sutton (also an on-field match official)
*Steve Chiddy was in the bunker for some matches in for the first 8 rounds of 2022, but due to errors made he's only been in the bunker for the New Zealand vs Tonga women's international since. He is likely not to return to the bunker, as the NRL are looking to phase out former on-field officials.

Sponsorship 
The NRL and its clubs receive significant revenue from sponsorships, with sponsors' logos appearing on most parts of players' and referees' uniforms, the playing surface and even the ball itself. Since 2001, the National Rugby League premiership has been sponsored by Telstra and known as the 'NRL Telstra Premiership'. Prior to this, the competition was simply known as the 'National Rugby League'.

The Telstra Premiership has had five competition logos since 2001. The first, lasting only through the 2001 regular season, was the Telstra logo with an elongated circle enclosing the word Premiership. From the Finals series of 2001 through to the end of 2006 the logo was based around the shape of a football, with the words Telstra Premiership on respective lines along the bottom, culminating with a small football similar to the one in the official NRL logo at the peak. The main colours were dark blue and orange, the corporate colours of Telstra. The company worked with the NRL to create the third logo for the 2007 season onward as part of a new sponsorship deal. This logo was quite similar to the original National Rugby League emblem. From the 2011 Finals Series, a newer logo was commissioned in concert with a corporate re-brand undertaken by Telstra. The 2007 logo remained on club jerseys until 2012 due to the lateness of the change and was phased out in time for the 2013 NRL Season. From 2013, under a dramatic image rebranding of the competition, the Telstra Premiership logo was changed in conjunction with a new sponsorship deal to incorporate the key elements of rugby league in Australia to include the shield and chevrons, the green and gold, a red "Telstra" logo perched above the top of the shield and for the first time the iconic Provan-Summons trophy awarded to the premiers at the end of the season centred in the middle of the badge.

At the end of the 2018 season the NRL launched a bold new look for its Telstra Premiership. The new look aims to modernise the Telstra Premiership brand as well as integrate it more seamlessly with the 16 clubs. The new brand, highlighting the shield and the chevron – which have both been synonymous with Rugby League since the game's inception.

Other notable sponsorships include Hisense (Thursday Night Football), Victoria Bitter (Friday Night Football), Bundaberg Rum (Super Saturday), Chemist Warehouse (Sunday Football). Steeden is the official match ball supplier, Westpac sponsor the match ball. The State of Origin series and the Australian Test matches (Kangaroos). Youi and Harvey Norman sponsor the on-field match officials and KFC sponsors the NRL Bunker. Other Official NRL Sponsors are: Coca Cola Amatil, Hankook, Home Hardware, Rebel, TWE (Wolf Blass), Accor, Drinkwise, P&O, Gallagher and EISS Super. Partners of the NRLW Competition are: Telstra, Harvey Norman, Chemist Warehouse, Flight Centre and Rebel.

See also

 List of National Rugby League stadiums
 Rugby league in Australia
 New South Wales Rugby League premiership
 List of sports attendance figures – the NRL's attendance in a worldwide context
 NRL Women's Premiership – the official league for women's rugby league in Australia starting in 2018

References

External links

 Official website
 Official Livestream channel

 
Rugby league competitions in Australia
Nine's Wide World of Sport
Fox Sports (Australian TV network)
1997 establishments in Australia
Sports leagues established in 1997
Professional sports leagues in Australia
Professional sports leagues in New Zealand
Multi-national professional sports leagues